Apache: Air Assault is a combat flight simulator video game for Microsoft Windows, PlayStation 3 and Xbox 360.  It was developed by Russian developer Gaijin Entertainment, which is most famous for its World War II MMO-game War Thunder and published by Activision.

The game is a combat flight simulator where players may pilot several types of Apache attack helicopters. The primary goal of most missions is to stop terrorist attacks in fictional, volatile war-ravaged regions.

Aircraft
The main web page for the game shows several different aircraft including A-10 Warthog and drones.

All playable aircraft can be customized with decals. In addition, the player can choose different control layouts in correspondence to their controller.

Multiplayer
Apache supports local and online multiplayer. During the local multiplayer, two players can play on the same console sharing the same view as pilot and gunner in one helicopter.

Online multiplayer allows co-op missions where each player pilots their own helicopter up to a maximum of four players.

Reception

The game received generally mixed reviews, with IGN and GameSpot both giving the title 7.5 out of 10.

PlayStation Weekly's Chace Frost awarded Apache: Air Assault a bronze trophy. He stated that the graphics were above average, but the multiplayer was lacking.

References

External links
 
 

2010 video games
Activision games
Video games developed in Russia
PlayStation 3 games
Windows games
Xbox 360 games
Combat flight simulators
Multiplayer and single-player video games
Helicopter video games
Gaijin Entertainment games